Autobiography of a Princess is a 1975 film directed by James Ivory and starring James Mason and Madhur Jaffrey. It was written by Ruth Prawer Jhabvala and produced by Ismail Merchant.

Plot
An Indian princess (Madhur Jaffrey), long-divorced and living in self-enforced exile in 1970s London, spends time with her father's ex-tutor, Cyril Sahib (James Mason), watching film footage of Royal India and talking of a past world.  There is a great deal of fascinating real-life footage and interviews with India's royalty: the Maharajas of India and the end they faced due to the 1960s socialist reforms introduced by India's then Prime Minister Mrs. Indira Gandhi.

Cast

Revival
In 2014, the Oregon Cartoon Institute brought James Ivory to Portland, Oregon, to appear in person at the Hollywood Theatre, to present two films he had personally chosen from the dozens he had directed. On 11 October it was Autobiography of a Princess (1975), shown in 35mm. Mr. Ivory introduced the film to the audience.

References

Further reading
Autobiography of a Princess: also being the adventures of an American film director in the land of the maharajahs; compiled by James ivory; photographs by John Swope and others; screenplay by Ruth Prawer Jhabvala. London: John Murray, 1975

External links
 
 Merchant Ivory overview

1975 films
British Indian films
English-language Indian films
Merchant Ivory Productions films
Films directed by James Ivory
Films with screenplays by Ruth Prawer Jhabvala
1970s English-language films